This is a list of the members of the 13th Seanad Éireann, the upper house of the Oireachtas (legislature) of Ireland.  These Senators were elected or appointed in 1973, after the 1973 general election and served until the close of poll for the 14th Seanad in 1977.

Composition of the 13th Seanad
There are a total of 60 seats in the Seanad. 43 Senators are elected by the Vocational panels, 6 elected by the Universities and 11 are nominated by the Taoiseach.

The following table shows the composition by party when the 13th Seanad first met on 1 June 1973.

List of senators

Changes

See also
Members of the 20th Dáil
Government of the 20th Dáil

References

External links

 
13